The International Council of Nurses (ICN)  is a federation of more than 130 national nurses associations.  It was founded in 1899 and was the first international organization for health care professionals.  It is headquartered in Geneva, Switzerland.

The organization's goals are to bring nurses' organizations together in a worldwide body, ic status of nurses and the profession of nursing worldwide, and to influence global and domestic health policy.

Membership is limited to one nursing organization per nation. In most cases, this is the national nurses' association (such as the American Nurses Association, the Slovak Chamber of Nurses and Midwives or the Nursing Association of Nepal). In 2001, ICN permitted its members to adopt alliance or collaborative structures to be more inclusive of other domestic nursing groups. However, few member organizations have adopted the new structures.

History and organization 
ICN was founded in 1899 with Great Britain, the United States, and Germany as charter members.  ICN is governed by a Council of National Representatives (CNR). The CNR is the governing body of the ICN and sets policy, admits members, selects a board of directors, and sets dues.  As of 2013, there were 135 National Representatives (one for each member organization). National Representatives are selected by each member association. The CNR meets every two years.

Between meetings of the CNR, ICN is governed by a 16-member board of directors.  Members of the board include ICN president and 13 directors elected on the basis of proportional representation from ICN's seven geographic areas. Directors are term-limited to two consecutive four-year terms of office.  The board meets at least once a year, although it usually meets three to four times a year.

ICN has four officers.  They include a president and three vice presidents.  The officers function as an executive committee for the board, and as the board's budget and finance committee.  The president is elected by the CNR. The president serves a four-year term of office, and is limited to one term in office.  The vice presidents are elected from among the board members.  The highest vote-getter is the First Vice President, the second-highest vote-getter the Second Vice President and the third-highest vote-getter the Third Vice President.

Day-to-day operations of ICN are overseen by a chief executive officer (CEO) who works in close collaboration with the ICN President.

Conferences and projects 
ICN hosts a Congress every two years in conjunction with the meeting of the CNR.  The congress hosts a large number of professional practice workshops, poster sessions, luncheons, speaking events and plenary sessions.

ICN hosts other conferences on an as-needed basis.  Recent conferences have covered topics such as regulation of the profession of nurses, socio-economic welfare issues, leadership issues and advanced practice issues.

ICN sponsors International Nurses' Day every May 12 (the anniversary of Florence Nightingale's birthday).

Official Journal of ICN: International Nursing Review (INR).
This is a highly respected, scientific journal with an impact factor and a readership in around 135 countries. It has been published since 1953, when it replaced an earlier ICN publication.   The journal's Editor in Chief is Dr Sue Turale, who is supported by two Associate Editors, Dr Pamela Mitchell from Seattle, Washington USA, and Dr Tracey McDonald from Sydney, Australia. INR is a major voice of ICN, and a peer-reviewed journal that focuses predominantly on nursing policy and health policy issues of relevance to nursing. It is published online and in hard copy 4 times a year in English, and also translated into Spanish and Chinese. INR was admitted in to the prestigious Nursing Journal Hall of Fame in 2016 by the International Academy of Nurse Editors (INANE).  Homepage: http://onlinelibrary.wiley.com/journal/10.1111/(ISSN)1466-7657

Presidents of ICN 

Country represented in brackets.
 1899 - 1904 Ethel Bedford Fenwick (UK)
 1904 - 1909 Susan McGahey (Australia)
 1909 - 1912 Agnes Karll (Germany)
 1912 - 1915 Annie Warburton Goodrich (USA)
 1915 - 1922 Henny Tscherning (Denmark)
 1922 - 1925 Sophie Mannerheim (Finland)
 1925 - 1929 Nina Gage (China)
 1929 - 1933 Leonie Chaptal (France)
 1933 - 1937 Alicia Still (UK)
 1937 - 1947 Effie J. Taylor (USA)
 1947 - 1953 Gerda Höjer (Sweden)
 1953 - 1957 Marie Bihet (Belgium)
 1957 - 1961 Agnes Ohlson (USA)
 1961 - 1965 Alice Clamageran (France)
 1965 - 1969 Alice Girard (Canada)
 1969 - 1973 Margarethe Kruse (Denmark)
 1973 - 1977 Dorothy Cornelius (USA)
 1977 - 1981 Olive Anstey (Australia)
 1981 - 1985 Eunice Muringo Kiereini (Kenya)
 1985 - 1989 Nelly Garzón Alarcón (Colombia)
 1989 - 1993 Mo-Im Kim (South Korea)
 1993 - 1997 Margretta Styles (USA)
 1997 - 2001 Kirsten Stallknecht (Denmark)
 2001 - 2005 Christine Hancock (UK)
 2005 - 2009 Hiroko Minami (Japan)
 2009 - 2013 Rosemary Bryant (Australia)
 2013 - 2017 Judith Shamian (Canada)
 2017 - 2021 Annette Kennedy (Ireland)

See also 

 List of nursing organizations

References

External links
 

 
Organizations established in 1899
Organisations based in Geneva